The population of the Federated States of Micronesia is predominantly Christian, although the representation of various denominations varies greatly from state to state. The government generally upholds the freedom of religion, but the small Muslim community in the country faces significant discrimination from both general society and the government.

Demographics 
The Roman Catholic Church, as well as several Protestant denominations, are active in every Micronesian state. Most Protestant groups trace their roots to American Congregationalist missionaries. On the island of Kosrae, the population is approximately 7,800; (95% Protestant). On Pohnpei, the population of 35,000 is evenly divided between Catholics and Protestants (50% catholic & 50% Protestant). On Chuuk and Yap, (an estimated 60% Catholic & 40% Protestant). Religious groups with small followings include Baptists, Assemblies of God, Salvation Army, Church of Christ, Seventh-day Adventists, Jehovah's Witnesses, the Church of Jesus Christ of Latter-day Saints, and the Baháʼí Faith.  There is a small group of Buddhists on Pohnpei, (0.7% Buddhist) (population as of 2010). Attendance at religious services is generally high; churches are well supported by their congregations and play a significant role in civil society. The Ahmadiyya Muslims were registered in Kosrae in July 2015, despite strong public resistance against Islam in the country.

Most immigrants are Filipino Catholics who have joined local Catholic churches. The Filipino Iglesia ni Cristo also has a church in Pohnpei. In the 1890s, on the island of Pohnpei, intermissionary conflicts and the conversion of clan leaders resulted in religious divisions along clan lines which persist today. Protestants are the majority on the western side of the island, while Catholics are the majority on the eastern side. Missionaries of many religious traditions are present and operate freely. The Constitution provides for freedom of religion, and the Government generally respected this right in practice. The US government received no reports of societal abuses or discrimination based on religious belief or practice in 2007.

Religious freedom 
The constitution of Micronesia states that laws establishing a state religion or impeding the freedom of religion may not be passed.

There are no registration requirements for religious groups. There is no religious education in public schools, but private religious schools are allowed so long as they also teach the curriculum established by the Department of Education.

A small community of Ahmadiyya Muslims (~20 people as of 2017) have reported discrimination, including both the denial of government services and vandalism against their property.

See also
Religion in Yap
Roman Catholic Diocese of Caroline Islands
The Church of Jesus Christ of Latter-day Saints in the Federated States of Micronesia
Adelyn Noda

References

Further reading
Francis X. Hezel in 
 Francis X. Hezel. The Catholic Church in Micronesia: Historical Essays on the Catholic Church in the Caroline-Marshall Islands (1991)